The Bald Hills Wind Farm is an operating wind farm located approximately 10 km south east of Tarwin Lower in South Gippsland, Victoria, Australia.  The Bald Hills Wind Farm site covers approximately 1,750ha of largely cleared cattle and sheep grazing farmland. The turbines are located in three distinct areas, one to the west and one to the east of Tarwin Lower Waratah Road, and one near the end of Bald Hills Road.

Overview 
The Bald Hills Wind Farm received planning approval from the Victorian Government and approval from the Federal Government under the Environmental Protection and Biodiversity Conservation (EPBC) Act.  This followed extensive project feasibility studies and Environmental Effects Statements (EESs). The EESs were assessed by an independent panel.

Bald Hills Wind Farm comprises 52 turbines of 2.05 MW capacity each, giving it a total capacity of 106.6 MW. It is expected to produce 380 GWh of electricity per year, based on the long-term average forecast wind data. This is the equivalent of meeting the electricity requirements of over 62,000 homes—over four and a half times the homes in the South Gippsland Shire (based on 2006 census data).

Construction of the wind farm commenced in August 2012 and it became fully operational in May 2015.

In 2022, the government told the wind farm that it will need to make some changes because of noise at night. A number of people living in the area had complained last year.

References

External links 

 

Wind farms in Victoria (Australia)
Environment of Victoria (Australia)